Marrit Leenstra (born 10 May 1989) is a Dutch former long track speed skater.

Skating career
In the 2007 season she made her World Cup debut in Moscow.

In the 2008 season she skated a junior world record in the 1500 meters at the World Cup in Salt Lake City. Later this season she qualified for the European Championships and ranked 6th after all four distances. With this result she qualified for the World Allround. At the World Allround Championships in Berlin she placed 12th after four distances. In February 2008, Leenstra was crowned the World Junior Speed Skating Champion in Changchun, China. At the end of the season in March 2008 she improved the junior world records on the 1000 and 1500 meters and the mini combination. The latter two are still current junior world records.

In the 2009 season Marrit Leenstra did not qualify for the European Championships, World Sprint Championships or World Allround Championships, however she did qualify for the World Single Distance Championships in the 1500 metres where she finished tenth.

After a disappointing 2010 season, where she failed to qualify for the 2010 Winter Olympics, she had a breakthrough 2011 season. Leenstra won the Dutch Allround Championships and placed third in the European Championships and fourth in the World Allround Championships. Also she placed fourth in the World Single Distances at the 1000 meters, second in the World Single Distances at the team pursuit and second in the World Cup standings for the 1500 meters, including a World Cup win in Salt Lake City.

Leenstra retired from competitive skating in August 2018.

Personal life
Leenstra is married to Italian Olympic gold medalist skater Matteo Anesi.

Records

Personal records

World records

Tournament results

Junior
 After the 2008 season, she continued as a senior speed skater.

Senior

Note: First European Sprint Championship was held in January 2017.           During Olympic seasons World Single Distance Championships are not held.

World Cup results
All results are sourced from the International Skating Union (ISU).

Note: Points column in team sprint and team pursuit events represents the point score of Netherlands team, hence results from the World Cup races that Leenstra did not participate are included.

World Cup podiums
 18 wins 
 69 podiums

Individual podiums
 5 wins 
 45 podiums

Team podiums
 13 wins – (12 , 1 ) 
 24 podiums – (22 , 2 )

References

External links
Marrit Leenstra at the International Skating Union
Marrit Leenstra at SpeedSkatingStats.com
http://www.speedskating-online.com/newsjanuary2008.htm
http://www.sskating.com/index.php?&season=2007/2008&name=LEENSTRA&fname=Marit&nat=NED&lm=l
http://www.desg.de/?page_id=813&anzeige=result&eventresultID=39735

1989 births
Dutch female speed skaters
Speed skaters at the 2014 Winter Olympics
Speed skaters at the 2018 Winter Olympics
Olympic speed skaters of the Netherlands
Medalists at the 2014 Winter Olympics
Medalists at the 2018 Winter Olympics
Olympic medalists in speed skating
Olympic gold medalists for the Netherlands
Olympic silver medalists for the Netherlands
Olympic bronze medalists for the Netherlands
Sportspeople from Friesland
People from Gaasterlân-Sleat
Living people
World Single Distances Speed Skating Championships medalists
21st-century Dutch women